Benthofascis angularis is a species of sea snail, a marine gastropod mollusk in the family Conorbidae.

These snails are predatory and venomous. They are capable of "stinging" humans, therefore live ones should be handled carefully or not at all.

Description
The length of an adult shell attains 27 mm, its diameter 11.1 mm.

Distribution
This marine species is endemic to Australia and occurs off Southwestern Australia.

Habitat 
Maximum recorded depth is 30 m.

References

External links
 

angularis
Gastropods of Australia